The men's team épée competition at the 2010 Asian Games in Guangzhou was held on 21 November at the Guangda Gymnasium.

Schedule
All times are China Standard Time (UTC+08:00)

Seeding
The teams were seeded taking into account the results achieved by competitors representing each team in the individual event.

Results
Legend
WO — Won by walkover

Final standing

References
Men's Team Epée Results

External links
Official website 

Men Epee